Sean Rooney may refer to:

 Sean Rooney (volleyball) (born 1982), American volleyball player
 Sean Rooney (soccer) (born 1989), Australian soccer player

See also
 Shaun Rooney (born 1996), Scottish footballer